The 2011–12 Oman First Division League (known as the Omantel First Division League for sponsorship reasons) is the 36th edition of the second-highest division overall football league in Oman. The season began on 5 October 2011 and concluded on 21 May 2012. Sur were the defending champions, having won their first title in the previous 2010–11 season.

League table

Promotion/relegation play-off

1st Leg

2nd Leg

Al Seeb secured promotion after winning 4:3 on aggregate
In the 2012–13 season the league had increased from 12 to 14 teams. As a result, despite losing the relegation play-off to Al-Seeb Club, Al-Hilal SC retained their place in the top division and Al-Musannah SC, whose 11th-place finish would have seen them relegated also retained their place in the top division.

References

Oman First Division League seasons
Oman
2011–12 in Omani football